Bane NOR SF, formerly Jernbaneinfrastrukturforetaket (English: Railway Infrastructure Company), is the Norwegian government agency responsible for owning, maintaining, operating and developing the Norwegian railway network, including the track, stations, etc. It is the result of the rail reform of the Conservative-led coalition. The agency which is organized as a state enterprise became operational on 1 January 2017. Bane NOR, and the Norwegian Railway Directorate replaced the former agency, the Norwegian National Rail Administration.

References

Government agencies of Norway
Rail transport in Norway
Railway companies of Norway
Government agencies established in 2016
Railway companies established in 2016
Ministry of Transport (Norway)
Railway infrastructure managers
Norwegian companies established in 2016